Ikram Aliskerov (born December 7, 1992) is a Russian mixed martial artist and combat sambo competitor  who competes in the  middleweight division of the Ultimate Fighting Championship (UFC).

Aliskerov is a Combat Sambo World Champion, who has won 4 world championship with two different organization (FIAS & WCSF), and has won 2 European championship, again under two organizations (ESF & ECSF).

Ikram Aliskerov also has highly significant victories over fellow world champions like Yaroslav Amosov, Murad Kerimov and Raimond Magomedaliev in various combat sambo tournaments.

Background 
Aliskerov was born in the village of Kasumkent in Dagestan, Russia. During his time as a combat sambo competitor, he became a World Champion in 2016, under world renowned FIAS banner a two-time World Cup champion in 2014 and 2015, again both under FIAS banner and a European Champion in 2017. under prestigious European Sambo Federation banner.

In September 2012, Aliskerov earlier won World Championship in Combat Sambo in 82 kg, under less known European Combat Sambo Federation banner. It was here current Bellator welterweight champion Yaroslav Amosov came out third in 82 kg category against Aliskerov.

And in December 2012, Aliskerov won World Combat Sambo Championship in 82 kg under less renowned World Combat Sambo Federation banner. It was again in this tournament Amosov came out third against Aliskerov. Ikram Aliskerov is one of a few combat athletes who have technically beaten Yaroslav Amosov on two occasions in Combat Sambo tournaments.

Mixed martial arts career

Early career 
Aliskerov competed three times in MMA during 2012 and 2015, winning all of his matches.

Brave Combat Federation 
Aliskerov then focused entirely on this sport in 2017, when he signed a contract with Brave Combat Federation. He was scheduled to make his promotional debut against Will Fleury on April 29, 2017, at BCF 6. However, Fleury was forced to pull out of the contest and was replaced by Rufat Asadov. He won the bout via submission in the first round.

Aliskerov faced Jeremy Smith on November 17, 2017, at BCF 9. He won the fight via knockout in the first round.

Aliskerov faced Chad Hanekom on March 2, 2018, at BCF 10. He won the bout by split decision.

He was then scheduled to meet Diego Gonzalez on August 18, 2018, at BCF 14. However, Gonzalez pulled out of the bout and was replaced by Joey Michael Berkenbosch. He won the bout via technical knockout in the first round.

Aliskerov faced Geraldo Coelho de Lima Neto on December 28, 2018, at BCF 21. He won the fight via technical knockout in the third round.

Aliskerov faced undefeated prospect Khamzat Chimaev on April 19, 2019, at BCF 23. He lost the fight via knockout in the first round, marking his first and only defeat to date.

Aliskerov was slated to came back against Mohammad Fakhreddine on October 4, 2019, at BCF 27. However, the bout was cancelled due to the COVID-19 pandemic. Instead, he faced Diego Gonzalez on December 27, 2019, at BCF 33. He won the bout via technical knockout in round three.

Aliskerov faced Denis Tiuliulin on September 17, 2020, at Brave CF 41. He won the fight via submission in the third round.

Aliskerov faced Miro Jurković on March 25, 2021, at Brave CF 49. He won the bout via second round kimura.

Eagle Fighting Championship 

Aliskerov faced Nah-Shon Burrell at Eagle FC 46 on March 11, 2022. At weigh ins, Ikram Aliskerov missed weight for his bout. Aliskerov weighed in at 186.2 pounds, 0.2 pounds over the middleweight non-title limit. The bout proceeded at catchweight and he was fined a percentage of his purse, which went to Burrell. He won the bout via unanimous decision.

Dana White Contender Series 
Aliskerov faced Mário Sousa on September 13, 2022 at Dana White's Contender Series 54. He won the fight via kimura submission in round one, winning a UFC contract in the process.

Championships and accomplishments

Combat Sambo
Fédération Internationale de Sambo
 World Championship 
 World Cup Championship  
 World Cup Championship 
World Combat Sambo Federation
 World Championship    
European Sambo Federation
 European Championship 
 European Combat Sambo Federation
 European Championship 
 All-Russian Sambo Federation
 Cup of Russia in Combat Sambo 
 Russian Combat Sambo Championship

Mixed martial arts record

|-
| Win
| align=center| 13–1
| Mário Sousa
| Submission (kimura)
| Dana White's Contender Series 54
| 
| align=center|1
| align=center|2:09
| Las Vegas, Nevada, United States
| 
|-
| Win
| align=center| 12–1
| Nah-Shon Burrell
| Decision (unanimous)
| Eagle FC 46
| 
| align=center|3
| align=center|5:00
| Miami, Florida, United States
| 
|-
| Win
| align=center| 11–1
| Miro Jurković
| Submission (kimura)
| Brave CF 49
| 
| align=center| 2
| align=center| 1:11
| Riffa, Bahrain
|
|-
| Win
| align=center| 10–1
| Denis Tiuliulin
| Submission (kimura)
| Brave CF 41
| 
| align=center| 3
| align=center| 1:48
| Riffa, Bahrain
|
|-
| Win
| align=center| 9–1
| Diego Gonzalez
| TKO (punches)
| Brave CF 33
| 
| align=center| 3
| align=center| 2:04
| Jeddah, Saudi Arabia
|
|-
| Loss
| align=center| 8–1
| Khamzat Chimaev
| KO (punch)
| Brave CF 23
| 
| align=center| 1
| align=center| 2:26
| Amman, Jordan
| 
|-
| Win
| align=center| 8–0
| Geraldo Coelho de Lima Neto
| TKO (punches)
| Brave CF 21
| 
| align=center| 3
| align=center| 0:00
| Jeddah, Saudi Arabia
| 
|-
| Win
| align=center| 7–0
| Joey Michael Berkenbosch
| TKO (punches)
| Brave CF 14
| 
| align=center| 1
| align=center| 2:15
| Tangier, Morocco
|
|-
| Win
| align=center| 6–0
| Chad Hanekom
| Decision (split)
| Brave CF 10
| 
| align=center| 3
| align=center| 5:00
| Amman, Jordan
|
|-
| Win
| align=center| 5–0
| Jeremy Smith
| KO (punches)
| Brave CF 6
| 
| align=center| 1
| align=center| 2:01
| Isa Town, Bahrain
|
|-
| Win
| align=center| 4–0
| Rufat Asadov
| Submission (guillotine choke)
| Brave CF 6
| 
| align=center| 1
| align=center| 4:00
| Almaty, Kazakhstan
| 
|-
| Win
| align=center| 3–0
| Dmitry Aryshev
| Decision (unanimous)
| EFN - Fight Nights Dagestan
| 
| align=center| 2
| align=center| 5:00
| Kaspiysk, Russia
| 
|-
| Win
| align=center| 2–0
| Vladimir Stukalov
| Submission (armbar)
| Tech-Krep FC - Prime Selection 4: Grandmasters
| 
| align=center| 1
| align=center| 3:24
| Krasnodar, Russia
| 
|-
| Win
| align=center| 1–0
| Alimjon Shadmanov
| Decision (unanimous)
| Fight Star - European MMA Cup
| 
| align=center| 2
| align=center| 5:00
| Nizhny Novgorod, Russia
|

See also 

 List of current UFC fighters
 List of male mixed martial artists

References

External links 
 Ikram Aliskerov at Brave CF

1992 births
Living people
Lezgins
Russian male mixed martial artists
Dagestani mixed martial artists
Russian sambo practitioners
Russian sportsmen
Middleweight mixed martial artists
Mixed martial artists utilizing sambo
People from Suleyman-Stalsky District
Sportspeople from Makhachkala